Devin Robert DiDiomete (born May 9, 1988) is a Canadian-born Italian professional ice hockey player who plays left wing.  He currently is playing with Gyergyói HK in the Erste Liga. DiDiomete was selected by the Calgary Flames in the 7th round (187th overall) of the 2006 NHL Entry Draft.

Playing career
On October 20, 2008, DiDiomete was signed as a free agent by the New York Rangers.  During the 2012-13 season, DiDiomete spent time with the Cardiff Devils of the Elite Ice Hockey League, the Milverton Four Wheel Drives of the Western Ontario Athletic Association Senior Hockey League, the Colorado Eagles of the ECHL, and the Chicago Wolves of the American Hockey League.

On September 19, 2014, DiDiomete signed with Färjestads BK of the Swedish Hockey League after being given a try-out by the team on July 17, 2014.  After going scoreless in 12 games with Färjestads BK, DiDiomete briefly returned to the Milverton Four Wheel Drives before agreeing to play out the remainder of the season with the Italian club Hockey Milano Rossoblu of the Serie A.

After a short stint with the Sheffield Steelers of the Elite Ice Hockey League to start the 2014–15 season, DiDiomete joined the Allen Americans of the ECHL.  On November 11, 2014, DiDiomete was traded to the Missouri Mavericks of the ECHL in exchange for future considerations.  On November 24, 2014, the Mavericks traded DiDiomete to the Idaho Steelheads of the ECHL for undisclosed considerations.

On July 6, 2015,  DiDiomete returned to play in Europe when he signed with HC Banska Bystrica of the Slovak Extraliga.

DiDiomete has since played with Manchester Storm, HC Fassa, SG Cortina, UTE and HC Merano.

Career statistics

References

External links

1988 births
Living people
Canadian ice hockey left wingers
Ice hockey people from Ontario
Sportspeople from Stratford, Ontario
HC '05 Banská Bystrica players
Allen Americans players
Calgary Flames draft picks
Canadian ice hockey centres
Cardiff Devils players
Charlotte Checkers (1993–2010) players
Chicago Express players
Chicago Wolves players
Colorado Eagles players
Connecticut Whale (AHL) players
Färjestad BK players
SHC Fassa players
Hartford Wolf Pack players
Houston Aeros (1994–2013) players
Idaho Steelheads (ECHL) players
Manchester Storm (2015–) players
HC Merano players
Missouri Mavericks players
Sarnia Sting players
SG Cortina players
Sheffield Steelers players
Sudbury Wolves players
Újpesti TE (ice hockey) players
Wilkes-Barre/Scranton Penguins players
Wheeling Nailers players
Canadian expatriate ice hockey players in England
Canadian expatriate ice hockey players in Wales
Canadian expatriate ice hockey players in Sweden
Canadian expatriate ice hockey players in the United States
Canadian expatriate ice hockey players in Italy
Canadian sportspeople of Italian descent
Canadian expatriate ice hockey players in Slovakia
Canadian expatriate ice hockey players in Hungary
Canadian expatriate ice hockey players in Romania
Naturalised citizens of Italy
Italian expatriate sportspeople in Hungary
Italian expatriate sportspeople in Romania
Italian expatriate ice hockey people